Terry Cochrane (born January 22, 1963) is a former Canadian football running back who played four seasons in the Canadian Football League with the Saskatchewan Roughriders and Winnipeg Blue Bombers. He was drafted by the Calgary Stampeders in the fifth round of the 1985 CFL Draft. He played CIS football at the University of British Columbia.

Junior football
Cochrane played junior football for the Regina Rams of the Canadian Junior Football League. He was named PJFC Outstanding Offensive Back and Rookie of the Year in 1982. He was also named PJFC Most Valuable Player, Outstanding Offensive Back and CJFL Outstanding Offensive Player in 1983.

College career
Cochrane played CIS football for the UBC Thunderbirds. He was named MVP of the CIAU Central Bowl and helped the Thunderbirds win the 22nd Vanier Cup in 1986 after returning for his final year of CIS eligibility following his being drafted by the Calgary Stampeders of the CFL.

Professional career

Cochrane was selected by the Calgary Stampeders with the 38th pick in the 1985 CFL Draft and signed with the team.

He was signed by the Saskatchewan Roughriders in 1987 and played for them during the 1987 season.

He played for the Winnipeg Blue Bombers from 1988 to 1990, winning the 76th Grey Cup in 1988 and the 78th Grey Cup in 1990.

References

External links
Just Sports Stats

Living people
1963 births
Players of Canadian football from Saskatchewan
Canadian football running backs
Regina Rams players
Canadian Junior Football League players
UBC Thunderbirds football players
Saskatchewan Roughriders players
Winnipeg Blue Bombers players
Sportspeople from Regina, Saskatchewan